Trevor Hall is an American singer-songwriter and guitarist. His music is a fusion of roots, folk, and reggae. Many of Hall's themes revolve around spirituality and life exploration.

Early life and education
Hall grew up in Hilton Head Island, South Carolina.  He grew up surrounded by music due in part to his father who was a drummer and musician. After dabbling with multiple instruments including trombone and bass, he decided to learn guitar in hopes of becoming a singer-songwriter one day. At age 16 he recorded his first album.

Shortly after, Hall left South Carolina for Los Angeles where he enrolled and studied classical guitar at Idyllwild Arts Academy. During his time, he was introduced to yoga and meditation practices and spirituality, which made a major impact on him and has since influenced his life and music. He stated that one of the most important weekends of his life was when he went to a Hindu temple for a weekend while at Idyllwild. At the temple, he learned about the Hindu goddess Kali and was happily surprised to find out people worship God as a woman.

After he graduated, he attended a Kali Mandir (Hindu temple) and eventually accepted Hindu Swami Bhajanananda Saraswati as his guru. He has stated that he tries to treat his music as karma yoga, where he wants to create music that will help other people.  During his senior year at Idyllwild Arts Academy, Hall was signed to Geffen Records.

Career

Kala (2015)
His album, KALA, written in Hawaii and recorded in Los Angeles, was released on August 21, 2015. It debuted at No. 2 on the iTunes singer-songwriter chart.

The Fruitful Darkness (2018)
Released on June 1, 2018, The Fruitful Darkness was Hall's first completely independent release. After working with established labels for the first decade of his career, this project was supported solely by his fans and was the No. 1 music campaign in 2017 on KickStarter. Relix praised the album, saying "The Fruitful Darkness takes stock of Hall's inner world and, as you observe him wade through the abyss, he challenges you to do the same".

Red Rocks (2019) 
Hall headlined the historic Red Rocks Amphitheater on June 16, 2019, playing a packed show with Nahko and Medicine for the People, as well as Ayla Nereo. After the success of the show, Hall later announced on November 19, 2019, that he will be returning to headline the historic Red Rocks Amphitheater on May 1, 2020.

In And Through The Body (2020) 
Released on September 25, 2020, In And Through The Body was another of Hall's independent releases. According to Hall, the album "touches on the timeless human themes of love, struggle, growth and redemption" utilizing a "palette of genres that span from folk, roots-rock, indie, and electronic, all with a consistent wash of authentic far-Eastern influence".

Reception: interviews and reviews
Hall was a guest on Danica Patrick's podcast "Danica Patrick Pretty Intense." Patrick praised Hall's music, saying he "has a lot of heart, a lot of soul. He writes it all himself. He just has a really cool story".

Personal life
Hall is married to photographer Emory Hall.  The two met on an ashram in 2010 while in India, where Emory was studying at the time. They have a son, named Kailash, born March 2021.

Discography 
EPs
 2006: The Rascals Have Returned (Geffen Records)
 2015: Unpack Your Memories... (Vanguard Records)

Live albums
 2005: Trevor Hall Live (Geffen Records)
 2008: Alive & On the Road (With Chris Steele) (White Balloon)
 2010: Chasing The Flame - On the Road With Trevor Hall (Vanguard Records)

Studio albums
 2004: Lace Up Your Shoes (White Balloon)
 2008: The Elephant's Door (Never released) (Geffen Records)
 2008: This is Blue (White Ballon)
 2009: Trevor Hall (Vanguard Records)
 2011: Everything Everytime Everywhere (Vanguard Records)
 2014: Chapter of the Forest (Vanguard Records)
 2015: Kala (Vanguard Records)
 2017: The Fruitful Darkness (independent release)
 2020: In and Through the Body

Compilation appearances
 2007: Shrek the Third: The Motion Picture Soundtrack – "Other Ways"
 2007: Endless Highway: The Music of The Band – "Life Is a Carnival"
 2009: StreetEDGE Program: July Titles '09 – "The Lime Tree", "31 Flavors", and "Unity (featuring Matisyahu)"
 2009: Paste Magazine Sampler Issue 54 – "Unity"
 2010: Vanguard Records Summer Sampler – "The Lime Tree"
 2011: Putumayo World Music: Acoustic Café – "World Keeps Turnin'"

With "The Villagers Crew"
 2010: All Things Material & Spiritual (self-released)

Singles

References

External links 
 

1986 births
Living people
21st-century American guitarists
21st-century American male singers
21st-century American singers
American Hindus
American male guitarists
American male singers
Converts to Hinduism
Guitarists from South Carolina
People from Hilton Head, South Carolina
Singers from South Carolina
Vanguard Records artists